Charles Vere Ferrers Townshend Bootland (17 April 1916 – 1981) was a Scottish footballer who played for Dumbarton, Clyde and Kilmarnock.

Bootland died in Leith in 1981, at the age of 64.

References

1916 births
1981 deaths
Scottish footballers
Dumbarton F.C. players
Clyde F.C. players
Kilmarnock F.C. players
Scottish Football League players
Association football outside forwards